Efton M. Sager is a former Republican member of the North Carolina House of Representatives who represented the 11th district (including part of Wayne County) from 2009 to 2013. Sager previously served on the Wayne County Board of Commissioners from 2000 to 2008.

Electoral history

2019

2015

2012

2010

2008

Committee assignments

2011-2012 session
Agriculture  (Chair)
Appropriations 
Appropriations - Natural and Economic Resources (Vice Chair)
Commerce and Job Development 
Commerce - Business and Labor
Education 
Elections
Homeland Security, Military, and Veterans Affairs

2009-2010 session
Appropriations 
Appropriations - Natural and Economic Resources
Aging 
Election Law and Campaign Finance Reform 
Energy and Energy Efficiency 
Homeland Security, Military, and Veterans Affairs 
State Government/State Personnel

References

External links

Living people
Year of birth missing (living people)
People from Wayne County, North Carolina
People from Goldsboro, North Carolina
Republican Party members of the North Carolina House of Representatives
21st-century American politicians